Reinhold Roth (4 March 1953 – 15 October 2021) was a Grand Prix motorcycle road racer from Germany. His most successful years were in 1987 when he won the French Grand Prix, and finished the season in second place behind Anton Mang, and in 1989 when he won the Dutch and  Czechoslovakian Grand Prix and finished second to Sito Pons for the 250 world championship. Roth suffered severe injuries in a June 1990 racing accident and retired from competition.

The accident
Rijeka (Yugoslavia) 1990 in the 250cc GP a series of events that started with Wilco Zeelenberg falling on Saturday, so he did not race on Sunday, hence there was a free space for the race, and Australian Darren Milner, whose time was out of classification, got a chance to race. Rain started and the race was stopped the completed lap before the accident, but the flags did not show up on time to stop the leading group. On a left hand curve, all the front pilots were at full speed despite rain, including Roth, who collided with Milner who was riding very slow. In fact Reinhold Roth got the 6th place for the race, in the last season he was intended to participate. 2 months after the accident he woke up from the coma.

Motorcycle Grand Prix Results
Points system from 1969 to 1987:

Points system from 1988 to 1992:

(key) (Races in bold indicate pole position; races in italics indicate fastest lap)

References 

1953 births
2021 deaths
German motorcycle racers
250cc World Championship riders
350cc World Championship riders
500cc World Championship riders
People from Ravensburg (district)
Sportspeople from Tübingen (region)